Zamboanga City's 2nd congressional district is one of the two congressional districts of the Philippines in Zamboanga City. It has been represented in the House of Representatives since 2007. It was created by the 2004 reapportionment that divided the city into two congressional districts and which took effect in 2007. The district is composed of 60 barangays in the city's east coast and includes Sacol and Vitali islands, as well as parts of its downtown commercial area east of Veterans Avenue. It is currently represented in the 19th Congress by Manuel Jose Dalipe of the Lakas–CMD.

Representation history

Election results

2019

2016

2013

2010

See also
Legislative districts of Zamboanga City

References

Congressional districts of the Philippines
Politics of Zamboanga City
2004 establishments in the Philippines
Congressional districts of Zamboanga Peninsula
Constituencies established in 2004